Jose A Gonzalez (born June 6, 1983) is a Puerto Rican professional boxer who has challenged once for the WBO lightweight title.

Professional career
Gonzalez made his professional debut on April 25, 2008, winning a four-round points decision against Israel Suarez, who also debuted. Fighting exclusively in his native Puerto Rico for the next five years, Gonzalez would remain undefeated while making five successful defenses of the regional WBO Latino lightweight title. On May 11, 2013, Gonzalez travelled abroad for the first time to face WBO lightweight champion Ricky Burns. After nine rounds, and despite having built up a comfortable lead on all three judges' scorecards, Gonzalez surprised onlookers by retiring on his stool, citing a wrist injury.

More than a year-and-a-half later, Gonzalez returned to the ring on December 20, 2014, regaining the vacant WBO Latino lightweight title by stopping Antonio João Bento in two rounds. On June 26, 2015, Gonzalez was stopped in seven rounds by Diego Magdaleno.

Professional boxing record

References

External links

1983 births
Living people
Puerto Rican male boxers
Lightweight boxers
People from Toa Baja, Puerto Rico
21st-century Puerto Rican people